Tom Rinaldi is a reporter for Fox Sports. He previously contributed to ESPN's tennis coverage at Wimbledon and the US Open, ESPN's golf coverage, SportsCenter, Outside the Lines, College GameDay and Sunday NFL Countdown. He also did features for the horse racing telecasts.

In 2017, Rinaldi served as a sideline reporter for the NBA playoffs on ESPN.

Rinaldi joined ESPN in May 2003 following a four-year stint as a reporter for CNN/SI from 1998–2002. He worked as a reporter for KATU-TV in Portland, Oregon from 1996 to 1998 and for WNDU-TV in South Bend, Indiana from 1993 to 1996. In December 2020, it was announced that he had left ESPN to sign with Fox Sports, where he is expected to cover major sporting events, including the Super Bowl, World Series, World Cup and major college football games. Prior to his career in journalism, Rinaldi was a high school English and English as a Second Language teacher in addition to being a handball coach at Morris High School in the Bronx, New York.

Rinaldi has won 16 Sports Emmy Awards, 7 Edward R. Murrow Awards, 3 Associated Press Awards and a USA Today Feature-of-the-Year Award.

Rinaldi grew up in Cresskill, New Jersey and graduated from Cresskill High School. After transferring from Fordham University, he earned his undergraduate degree from the University of Pennsylvania (where he was on the parliamentary debate team), before going on to receive his graduate degree at Columbia University Graduate School of Journalism. He lives in nearby Tenafly, with his wife, Dianne, their son, Jack, and daughter, Tessa. In 2016, he wrote a book called The Man in the Red Bandanna, about Welles Crowther, an NYC volunteer firefighter, who rescued 18 people before losing his own life when the World Trade Center collapsed after the September 11 attacks.

From 2006 to 2020, Rinaldi was the lead interviewer and feature reporter for ESPN and ABC's coverage of golf. In this capacity, he has been praised for many of his essays, especially those following the conclusion of major events. Rinaldi conducted the first interview of Tiger Woods after the incident on November 27, 2009 which led to Woods' public disclosure of his extra-marital affairs.

References

External links
 Rinaldi's bio at ESPN.com
 

Living people
American horse racing announcers
College football announcers
ESPN people
Fox Sports 1 people
National Football League announcers
American television sports announcers
Tennis commentators
Golf writers and broadcasters
National Basketball Association broadcasters
Year of birth missing (living people)
People from Cresskill, New Jersey
People from Tenafly, New Jersey
Competitive debaters